Mark Stephen Hotte (born 27 September 1978 in Bradford, England) is an English football player, who plays for Ossett Town.

Career
He joined Scarborough from Oldham Athletic in the 2001–02 season. In the 2003–04 season Mark was voted Scarborough's player of the season. He signed a new deal with Scarborough in June 2003. Has been seen in goal in recent years, but is generally still seen as a solid centre back. In the 2005–06 he played for York City, but the following year he returned to Scarborough under new manager Mark Patterson. Hotte joined Droylsden on 25 June 2007. Vauxhall Motors signed him in September to bolster their defence. A month later, he joined Farsley Celtic. He signed for Northern Premier League Division One North side Bradford Park Avenue in March 2008.

In August 2010 he signed for Ossett Town.

Notes

External links

1978 births
Living people
English footballers
Oldham Athletic A.F.C. players
Scarborough F.C. players
York City F.C. players
Droylsden F.C. players
Vauxhall Motors F.C. players
Farsley Celtic A.F.C. players
Bradford (Park Avenue) A.F.C. players
FC Halifax Town players
Ossett Town F.C. players
Footballers from Bradford
Association football defenders